Leonid (Les) Stepanovych Tanyuk (August 7, 1938 – March 18, 2016) was a Ukrainian theatre and film director, Soviet dissident and after 1991's Ukrainian independence, a multi-term member of the Ukrainian parliament.

He was a husband of Nelli Korniyenko, a native of Khabarovsk and merited worker of arts of Ukraine.

Biography 

Tanyuk was born in Zhukyn, Dymer Raion (liquidated), Kyiv Oblast, the son of Stephen Samiylovych, a teacher of Ukrainian language and literatures.  His mother was Natalya Mykolayivna, also a teacher of languages.  After spending some of his childhood in a Nazi concentration camp, he and his family returned to Ukraine, but they were not allowed to live in Kyiv.  They returned to his father's hometown of Lutsk.

He studied at the National University of Theatre, Film and TV in Kyiv.

Club of Creative Youth 
In 1959, Tanyuk was one of the founders of the Club of Creative Youth (Клуб творчої молоді) in Kyiv.  He was elected the club's first president.  Under his leadership, the group was active in promoting Ukrainian culture and protesting Soviet totalitarianism.  He and other members were made demands to the Soviet authorities to preserve Churches and other monuments that faced destruction.  In 1962, he and fellow members Vasyl Symonenko and Alla Horska were sent to investigate information about mass graves in Bykivnia from the 1930s terror implemented by Joseph Stalin.  After questioning the locals, they wrote a letter to the authorities demanding an investigation into the executions and the burials.  It was at this point that the Soviets began to exert strong pressure on the club, and Tanyuk was removed as president, though he effectively continued to lead the organization until it was closed in 1964.

Dissident activities 
During the early 1960s, Tanyuk travelled around Ukraine and produced numerous drama productions, which were later banned.  He also established clubs similar to the Club of Creative Youth outside of Kyiv.

Activities since 1991's Ukrainian independence 
From 1991 till his death, Tanyuk was Chairman of the Union of theatrical figures of Ukraine.

In the 1990 Ukrainian parliamentary election Tanyuk was elected into the Verkhovna Rada (Ukraine's parliament). He was reelected in the 1994 Ukrainian parliamentary election and 1998 Ukrainian parliamentary election. All three times for Rukh. Tanyuk was reelected in the 2002 Ukrainian parliamentary election and 2006 Ukrainian parliamentary election and 2007 Ukrainian parliamentary election for the Our Ukraine Bloc.

Tanyuk died on March 18, 2016;  the cause of death was not disclosed.

References 

Museum of the Dissident Movement

External links

1938 births
2016 deaths
People from Kyiv Oblast
Nazi concentration camp survivors
Kyiv National I. K. Karpenko-Kary Theatre, Cinema and Television University alumni
Academic staff of Kyiv National I. K. Karpenko-Kary Theatre, Cinema and Television University
Ukrainian dissidents
Ukrainian theatre directors
Soviet dissidents
First convocation members of the Verkhovna Rada
Second convocation members of the Verkhovna Rada
Third convocation members of the Verkhovna Rada
Fourth convocation members of the Verkhovna Rada
Fifth convocation members of the Verkhovna Rada
People's Movement of Ukraine politicians
Burials at Baikove Cemetery
Recipients of the Order of Prince Yaroslav the Wise, 4th class
Theatre people from Kyiv